

References

1945 ballet premieres, List of
Lists of ballet premieres by year
Lists of 1940s ballet premieres
Ball